Victoria South was an electoral riding in Ontario, Canada. It was created in 1867 at the time of confederation. In 1886 the riding was reconfigured with Victoria North to form Victoria East and Victoria West ridings. It was re-established in 1914 and finally abolished in 1933 before the 1934 election.

Members of Provincial Parliament

References

Former provincial electoral districts of Ontario